José Mollá is an advertising executive who co-founded la comunidad/the community with his brother Joaquin Molla in 2001. Today the agency has offices in Miami, New York, San Francisco, London and Buenos Aires. He is currently la comu's Global Chief Creative Officer. 

La comunidad/the community was selected as one of the 25 most influential advertising agencies of the last 50 years, by Campaign magazine.

Before moving to Miami, Mollá was Creative Director at Wieden+Kennedy in Portland, Oregon, for five years.

References

External links
José Mollá interviewed at Cannes Lions International Advertising Festival

La Comunidad's Agency Story in Communication Arts
Interview with José Mollá & Joaquín Mollá in Men's Vogue Magazine

1967 births
Living people
Argentine advertising executives
Wieden+Kennedy people